Zaruba or Záruba (Czech feminine: Zárubová) is a surname of Czech origin. It may refer to:

 Adam Zaruba (born 1991), Canadian football player
 Gary E. Zaruba (1940–2014), American painter and art educator
 Jerzy Zaruba (1891–1971), Polish graphic artist, stage scenographer and caricaturist
 Karl Zaruba (1902–1978), Austrian composer
 Radek Záruba (born 1979), Czech sprint canoer

See also
 
 Zaruba, a character in the Japanese series Garo

Czech-language surnames